Braize is a commune in the Allier department in central France.

Geography

At its widest point, the commune is 8 km across, stretching from the Cher department to the Rond des Landes Blanches. It lies in a valley oriented east and west from La Pacaudière to Les Ris, the lowest point in the commune.

Much of the valley is swampy. It is drained by a brook that flows through several ponds. The lowest point in the commune is on the west.

On the south are the edges of the forest of Tronçais, dominated by several buttes at Rond du Haut du Parc and Puy Aigu, the highest point in the commune at Montaloyer.

On the north, a gentle slope rises to the present town, with its remarkable feudal motte Le Mamelon, close to the farm called La Commanderie. Northwest of Baignereau, the boundary is the river Sologne.

Beyond the village and to the edge of the commune, a slightly rolling plateau leads to the Verneuil vineyards, of which only a small part are still cultivated.

Economy
In the 1930s, Braize had a half dozen vineyards of 30 to 40 hectares.

Currently, there are about a half dozen farms raising primarily cattle and sheep. Tourist activities include fishing and camping.

Events
The traditional festival of the patron saint, La Saint Antoine, is celebrated January 17. The Foire aux ânes takes place the last Sunday in August.

Population

See also
Communes of the Allier department

References

Communes of Allier
Allier communes articles needing translation from French Wikipedia